Team Vulcun was a professional League of Legends team that competed in the North American League of Legends Championship Series (NA LCS). The team was formed on February 2, 2013, after it acquired the roster of Team FeaR.

Team Vulcun finished 3rd in the 2013 NA LCS Spring Split and again in the 2013 NA LCS Summer Split. The latter placement qualified them for the 2013 World Championship, where they placed 4th in Group B and 11th–12th overall.

On October 16, 2013, it was announced that Team Vulcun would rename to XDG Gaming. Around a year later, the organization completely dissolved.

Final roster

References 

Former North American League of Legends Championship Series teams
Esports teams based in the United States
Esports teams established in 2013
Esports teams disestablished in 2013